Rock is an unincorporated community in Mercer County, West Virginia, United States. Rock has a post office with ZIP code 24747.

The community most likely took its name from a large rock formation near the original town site.

References

Unincorporated communities in Mercer County, West Virginia
Unincorporated communities in West Virginia